The Pingsheng Bridge is single tower, single span self-anchored suspension bridge located in Foshan, Guangdong Province, China.

External links

https://web.archive.org/web/20130619212856/http://e.crpcec.com/tabid/1421/InfoID/16064/frtid/1354/Default.aspx
http://www.crbbi.com/En/Product/list_info.php?inid=1286339042

Bridges in Guangdong
Suspension bridges in China
Bridges completed in 2008
Transport in Guangdong
Buildings and structures in Foshan
Self-anchored suspension bridges